Sesia tibialis, the American hornet moth, poplar clearwing borer or cottonwood crown borer, is a moth of the family Sesiidae. It is known from North America, including British Columbia, Colorado, Utah, Michigan, Montana, Washington, California and Arizona.

Adults resemble hornets with black and yellow-striped bodies and transparent wings.

The larvae feed on common lilac, green ash, poplar, aspen, cottonwood and trembling aspen. It is a pest of poplar and willow and commonly feeds in hybrid poplar stool beds. They live in tunnels in the cambial area (bark-wood interface) of both the lower stem and roots of their host plant. The species requires two years to complete its life cycle, overwintering as a larva twice. Pupation occurs in silk-lined, wood chip pupal chambers in the soil if larvae have fed in host tree roots. They pupate just below the bark surface if they have fed in the stem. Depending on their location, pupae move to the surface of either soil or bark before emerging as adult moths in late June or early July.

References

Sesiidae
Moths described in 1839